Rya Teze ('New Path'), formerly written as Rja Ţəzə and Р’йа т'әзә (in Cyrillic script), was a Kurdish language newspaper published from Yerevan, Armenia. The newspaper was founded in March 1930 and the first issue was published on 25th March 1930, printed in Kurmanji Kurdish with the newly latinised alphabet of Shemo-Margulov. It was the organ of the Kurdish section of the Communist Party of Armenia, and was produced under the auspices of the Central Committee of the Communist Party of Armenia and the Supreme Council and the Council of Ministers of the Armenian SSR. At the time, it was a four-page newspaper, published twice every week and with a circulation of 600 copies. Prior to the Kurdish linguist and author Cerdoyê Genco taking over as editor in 1934, the newspaper was run by three Armenians born in Western Armenia: Kevork Paris, Hrachya Kochar and Harutyun Mkrtchyan, who knew Kurdish. Publication was discontinued in 1937.

In 1955 publication of Rya Teze (in Cyrillic script) was resumed with Miroyi Asad as its editor. As of the early 1970s it was published semiweekly and had a circulation of 2,800. By 1976 circulation reached 5,000.

As of the 1980s Rya Teze had a weekly circulation of 4,000 and was read by Kurds across the Soviet Union; a smaller number of readers existed among the Kurds in Europe, who sometimes adopted material from it in their own publications published in Germany and Sweden. In 1989 Tital Muradov took over as editor, and in 1991 the editorship was handed over to Emirike Serdar.

Following the disintegration of the Soviet Union the newspaper faced financial difficulties as it no longer received state support. It survived, however. It was converted into a monthly with a circulation of five hundred. In 2000 the script was changed back to Latin alphabet. The newspaper was shut down in 2003 due to economic problems. All in all 4,800 issues of Rya Teze were published between 1930 and 2003.

References

Kurdish-language newspapers
Communist newspapers
1930 establishments in the Soviet Union
2003 disestablishments in Armenia
Newspapers published in Armenia
Newspapers published in the Soviet Union
Newspapers established in 1930
Publications disestablished in 2003